Quassin is a white, bitter, crystalline substance that is the prototypical example of the family of quassinoids. It can be extracted from the quassia tree, from which it gets its name.  It was first isolated in 1937 and its chemical structure was elucidated in 1961. It is one of the most bitter substances found in nature, with a bitter threshold of 0.08 ppm and it is 50 times more bitter than quinine.

Extracts of the bitterwood tree (Quassia amara) containing quassin are used as additives in soft drinks.

Although its skeleton possesses 20 carbon atoms, quassin is not a diterpene but rather a triterpene lactone, which derives from euphol by loss of 10 carbon atoms including C4.

References 

Bitter compounds
Ethers
Quassinoids